The Women's 3000 metres event  at the 2007 European Athletics Indoor Championships was held on March 4.

Medalists

Results

References
Results

3000 metres at the European Athletics Indoor Championships
3000
2007 in women's athletics